Tongatapu 7 is an electoral constituency for the Legislative Assembly in the Kingdom of Tonga. It was established for the November 2010 general election, when the multi-seat regional constituencies for People's Representatives were replaced by single-seat constituencies, electing one representative via the first past the post electoral system. Located on the country's main island, Tongatapu, it encompasses the villages of Pea, Tokomololo, Haʻateiho, Lotohaʻapai, and part of Tofoa and Koloua.

Its first ever representative was Sione Saulala, a first time MP, representing the Democratic Party of the Friendly Islands. He lost the seat to the Democratic Party of the Friendly Islands's Sione Vuna Fa'otusia in 2014, but regained it at the 2021 election.

Members of Parliament

Election results

2010

References

Tongan legislative constituencies
Tongatapu
2010 establishments in Tonga
Constituencies established in 2010